Susan Seubert (born 1970) is an American fine art and editorial photographer based in Portland, Oregon and Maui, Hawaii. She has exhibited internationally, photographing subjects from Canada to Thailand.

Early life and education
Seubert was born in 1970 in Indianapolis, Indiana, the daughter of a nuclear physicist and a Russian scholar and attorney.

Seubert earned a B.F.A. at Pacific Northwest College of Art in 1992.

Career 

Seubert's first assignment for Newsweek was related to the 1994 Tonya Harding story. Since that time, according to Ifanie Bell, "The Portland-based photographer still makes her living taking pictures, but she has turned her lenses toward capturing stunning shots of landscapes, life and leisure."

In 2011 the Oregon Arts Commission said, "Seubert’s photography has been exhibited throughout the United States and abroad, including the 2005 Northwest Biennial, Tacoma Art Museum; Museum of Fine Arts, Houston, 2004; and the Portland Art Museum’s 1999 and 2001 Oregon Biennial. In 2001, Seubert was a finalist for the prestigious Betty Bowen Award at the Seattle Art Museum."

Critical reception
National Geographic Travel Expeditions said Seubert's photography represents "a variety of subjects and... a sense of place through her wide-ranging imagery. Susan's in-depth knowledge of digital technologies and her multimedia skills keep her at the cutting edge of visual storytelling."

Ken Johnson of the New York Times wrote, "Elegant emblematic photographs by Susan Seubert symbolizing various phobias address danger only from an indirect, dryly philosophical distance."

Bob Hicks of Oregon Arts Watch wrote of her exhibit "Not a Day Goes By",

Selected solo  exhibitions
 2015 100 Memories, G. Gibson Gallery, Seattle
 2012 Nerve-Wracked, Kittredge Gallery, Univ. Puget Sound, Tacoma, curated by Margaret Bullock
 2005 100 Cheerleaders, Sheehan Gallery, Whitman College, Walla Walla
 2005 Memento Mori and Other Tintypes, G. Gibson Gallery, Seattle
 2003 Bella Madrona, University of Portland—Buckley Center Gallery, Portland
 2002 Chimeras, in conjunction with FotoFest 2002, Mixture Contemporary Art, Houston (catalogue)
 1997 Panphobia, Houston Center For Photography, Gallery X, Houston
 1993 Every Three Seconds, Jamison Thomas Gallery, Portland

Selected awards 

 2014 Category 176–Gold, Photography: Photo Essay, Discovering Old Bangkok, North American Travel Journalists Association
 2014 National Geographic Traveler Gold Award for Photo Essay, "Saving Old Bangkok"
 2011 National Geographic Traveler Bronze Award for Portrait, People, "It's a Wonderful Life"
 2011 Oregon Arts Commission Award for the Ford Family Foundation Art Acquisition Grant Awards
 2010 Overall Excellence in Photography, North American Travel Journalists Association
 2009 National Geographic Traveler Award of Merit for Photography, Overall Excellence
 1999 Alfred Eisenstaedt Award, Columbia University

See also

 Photojournalism
 Fine-art photography

References

External links
 

Oregon Art Beat (video, 29:25)

1970 births
Living people
20th-century American women artists
21st-century American women artists
American photojournalists
National Geographic photographers
Photographers from Hawaii
Photographers from Oregon
American women photographers